The Wag-Aero CUBy is a replica of the Piper J-3, designed by Dick Wagner and marketed by Wag-Aero of Lyons, Wisconsin as plans or in kit form.

The aircraft is currently marketed under the name Wag-Aero Sport Trainer.

Design and development
Wag-Aero  started with a line of inspection covers, then eventually a comprehensive line of aircraft parts, including a full line of parts for the Piper Cub. After several attempts to purchase the rights to the Piper Cub for new production, Wag-Aero owner Jack Wagner designed a homebuilt kit that would allow homebuilders to construct new aircraft similar to the Cub.

While the CUBy was initially offered with wooden wing ribs and spars like the Piper Cub, aluminum ribs and spars were later added as an option, also like later Cubs. The aircraft does differ from the original Piper design in several ways including having its fuselage fabricated from 4130 steel instead of the Cub's original 1025 carbon steel and utilizing a conventional elevator-mounted trim tab in place of the Cub's jack screw trimming system that adjusts the Cub's elevator angle of incidence.

The CUBy drawings were drafted by Bill Blake.

The prototype first flew on March 12, 1975 fitted with skis.

Operational history
The introductory model was displayed with a contrasting paint scheme, one half painted green with a yellow stripe, and the other half painted yellow with a green stripe. This unusual "court jester" paint scheme was used to differentiate the prototype from the standard yellow scheme used on the Piper Cub, for marketing purposes.
Paul Poberezny became the first customer to build a CUBy. Poberezny's aircraft became part of the EAA AirVenture Museum Foundation and was used to demonstrate the use of automotive fuel in aircraft engines for the Experimental Aircraft Association.

Variants

CUBy
Base model, powered by a recommended standard Continental C-85 engine of  
CUBy Acro Trainer
Developed in 1977, the aircraft was fitted with a  Lycoming and clipped wings. The prototype featured the unique split-down the middle paint scheme  employed by Wag-Aero.
Observer
Sport Trainer with modifications to alter the window installation to resemble the Piper L-4
Sport Trainer
By December 2011 250 examples had been completed and flown.
Super Sport
Sport trainer with modifications to accept engines of up to

Specifications (Wag-Aero CUBy)

See also

References

External links

Wag-Aero aircraft
Homebuilt aircraft
High-wing aircraft
Single-engined tractor aircraft
Aircraft first flown in 1975